The Northern and Central Bitterroot Range, collectively the Bitterroot Mountains (Salish: čkʷlkʷqin), is the largest portion of the Bitterroot Range, part of the Rocky Mountains and Idaho Batholith, located in the panhandle of Idaho and westernmost Montana in the northwestern United States. The mountains encompass an area of 4,862 square miles (12,593 km²).

The mountains are bordered on the north by Lolo Creek, to the northeast by the Clark Fork, on the south by the Salmon River, on the east by the Bitterroot River and Valley, and on the west by the Selway and Lochsa Rivers.


Northern Bitterroot Range 

The Northern Bitterroot Range is the northernmost and shortest subrange of the Bitterroot Mountains. The Northern Bitterroots encompass 1,869 square miles (4,841 km²) and its two tallest peaks are the 7,930 foot (2,417 m) Rhodes Peak and the 7,770 foot (2,368 m) Quartz Benchmark.

The Northern Bitterroots also contain a smaller subrange, the Grave Creek Range. The Grave Creek Range is 262 square miles (679 km²) in area and its highest peak is the 7,270 foot (2,216 m) Petty Mountain.

Central Bitterroot Range 

The Central Bitterroot Range is the southernmost and tallest subrange of the Bitterroot Mountains. The Central Bitterroots encompass 2,993 square miles (7,752 km²) and its two tallest peaks are the 10,157 foot (3,096 m) Trapper Peak and the 9,983 foot (3,043 m) El Capitan.

The Central Bitterroots also contain a smaller subrange, the Como Peaks. The Como Peaks subrange is 79 square miles (205 km²) in area and its highest peak is the aforementioned El Capitan.

Early history
The Bitterroot Mountains presented an unexpected, formidable obstacle to Lewis and Clark during their expedition westward, and ended their expectation of finding a "Northwest Passage" giving an easy connection from the Atlantic watershed to that of the Pacific.

Bitterroot controversy
Guy M. Brandborg of the U.S. Forest Service, was supervisor of the Bitterroot National Forest from 1935 to 1955. By insisting on selection cutting, he tried to protect the watersheds and wildlife habitats that are harmed by clear-cutting. After he retired in 1955 Brandborg denounced the Forest Service for deviating from his model. He launched a public attack, known as the "Bitterroot controversy". Brandborg lobbied to secure passage of the National Forest Management Act of 1976, that codified his model.

See also

 Bitterroot National Forest
 List of mountain ranges in Montana
 List of mountain ranges in Idaho

Further reading
 Swanson, Frederick H. The Bitterroot and Mr. Brandborg: Clearcutting and the Struggle for Sustainable Forestry in the Northern Rockies (University of Utah Press, 2011).

References

Mountain ranges of Montana
Ranges of the Rocky Mountains
Landforms of Ravalli County, Montana
Landforms of Missoula County, Montana
Landforms of Mineral County, Montana
Bitterroot National Forest